Ponte d'Augusto may refer to the following bridges in Italy:

 Ponte d'Augusto (Narni)
 Ponte d'Augusto (Rimini)